Beant Singh may refer to:
 Beant Singh (politician) (1922–1995), former Chief Minister of Punjab
 Beant Singh (assassin) (1959–1984), who assassinated Indian Prime Minister Indira Gandhi